François Massialot (1660, in Limoges – 1733, in Paris) was a French chef who served as chef de cuisine (officier de bouche) to various illustrious personages, including Philippe I, Duke of Orléans, the brother of Louis XIV, and his son Philippe II, Duke of Orléans, who was first duc de Chartres then the Regent, as well as the duc d'Aumont, the Cardinal d’Estrées, and the marquis de Louvois.  His  first appeared, anonymously, as a single volume in 1691, and was expanded to two (1712) then three volumes, in the revised edition of 1733–34. His lesser cookbook, (Paris, Charles de Sercy), appeared, also anonymously, in 1692.

Massialot describes himself in his preface as "a cook who dares to qualify himself royal, and it is not without cause, for the meals which he describes...have all been served at court or in the houses of princes, and of people of the first rank." Places where Massialot served banquets included the Château de Sceaux, the Château de Meudon, and Versailles. An innovation in Massialot's book was the alphabetisation of recipes, "a step toward the first culinary dictionary" Barbara Wheaton observes; Wheaton has compared the changes made in the various editions of Massialot: a glass of white wine in a  fish stock makes a surprisingly late appearance, in 1703. Meringues make their first appearance under their familiar name in Massialot, who is also credited with crème brûlée, in which the sugar topping was melted and burnt with a red-hot fire shovel.

Massialot's works, translated into English as The Court and Country Cook (1702) and often reprinted, were used by professional chefs until the middle of the 18th century.

Notes

References

Further reading 
 Patrick Rambourg, Histoire de la cuisine et de la gastronomie françaises, Paris, Ed. Perrin (coll. tempus n° 359), 2010, 381 pages.

External links
 

1660 births
1733 deaths
French chefs
French food writers
French cookbook writers
18th-century French writers
18th-century French male writers
French male non-fiction writers